Fame and Fashion is a compilation album by English musician David Bowie, issued in 1984 by RCA Records featuring songs recorded from 1969's David Bowie through 1980's Scary Monsters (And Super Creeps).  It was released on LP, cassette, and CD formats. The subtitle "David Bowie's All-Time Greatest Hits" appears along with the title on LP and cassette labels, as well as on the CD face and inserts.

After Bowie left RCA Records in the early 1980s, RCA, wishing to continue to capitalize on Bowie's immense popularity at the time, continued to release compilation albums without his permission or input. Soon after the release of this album and the reissue of his entire RCA album catalog on compact disc, Bowie reclaimed the rights to his recordings and his entire RCA catalog went out of print until Bowie struck a deal with Rykodisc to reissue his recordings, beginning in 1989. As a result, Bowie's original RCA CDs are highly sought after, not only for their rarity but because many collectors feel they are sonically superior to reissues.

Nevertheless, the sound quality of Fame and Fashion has been questioned.  In fact, it has been noted that on the LP's second side and the corresponding tracks on the CD, the original stereo channels are swapped. In addition, all the songs except "Heroes" were previously issued on the Changesonebowie and Changestwobowie compilation albums, and three, "Golden Years", "Fashion", and "Ashes to Ashes" appeared on the Golden Years compilation less than a year earlier. 

As this album, and the previous compilation Golden Years were issued without Bowie's authorization, neither album has been reissued in any form.

Track listing
All tracks written by David Bowie except where noted.

Side one
 "Space Oddity" (from David Bowie, 1969) – 5:15
 "Changes" (from Hunky Dory, 1971) – 3:33
 "Starman" (from The Rise and Fall of Ziggy Stardust and the Spiders from Mars, 1972) – 4:10
 "1984" (from Diamond Dogs, 1974) – 3:24
 "Young Americans" (from Young Americans, 1975) – 5:10
 "Fame" (Bowie, Carlos Alomar, John Lennon) (from Young Americans) – 4:00

Side two
 "Golden Years" (from Station to Station, 1976) – 4:03
 "TVC 15" (from Station to Station) – 5:29
 "Heroes" (Bowie, Brian Eno) (from "Heroes", 1977) – 6:07
 "D.J." (Bowie, Eno, Alomar) (from Lodger, 1979) – 3:59
 "Fashion" (from Scary Monsters (And Super Creeps), 1980) – 4:51
 "Ashes to Ashes" (from Scary Monsters) – 4:21

Chart performance

Weekly charts

Year-end charts

References

Sources

David Bowie compilation albums
1984 compilation albums
RCA Records compilation albums